Rubem Valentim (9 November 1922 - 30 November 1991) was born in Salvador, Bahia, Brazil. A self-taught artist, he started to paint as a child, doing figure and landscapes for Christmas crèches.

Valentim graduated in dentistry in 1946, and practiced the profession while continuing to paint.  In 1948, he left dentistry to devote himself entirely to plastic arts.  He went on to study Journalism and received his bachelor's degree from the School of Philosophy of Bahia in 1953. He participated in the renovative movement in the arts, which began in Bahia in 1978–1948.

In 1957, Valentim moved to Rio de Janeiro. He was awarded a fellowship for travel abroad in 1962 by the XI National Salon of Modern Art. He traveled to Europe for 3 years, expressing an interest in the art of primitive peoples. He eventually settled in Rome, working and holding exhibitions there. He visited the Venice Biennials of 1964 and 1966. He traveled to Senegal to participate in the First World Festival of Negro Art in Dakar, Senegal in 1966. He returned to Brazil in 1966, after accepting an invitation from the Central Institute of the Arts of the University of Brasilia. He was awarded a Special Prize for "Contribution to Brazilian Painting"

Selected works
 , 1956-1962
 , 1960

References 

1922 births
Brazilian artists
1991 deaths
People from Salvador, Bahia